Mary Lou Retton (born January 24, 1968) is an American retired gymnast. At the 1984 Summer Olympics in Los Angeles, she won a gold medal in the individual all-around competition, as well as two silver medals and two bronze medals. Her performance made her one of the most popular athletes in the United States.

Her gold medal win was historic as Retton was the first American woman to win the all-around gold medal in Olympic gymnastics.

Personal life
Mary Lou Retton was born on January 24, 1968, in Fairmont, West Virginia. (The original family name was "Rotunda.") Her father, Ronnie, operated a coal-industry transportation equipment business. She attended Fairmont Senior High School, but did not graduate. She competed in the 1984 Olympic games in Los Angeles, California, during her sophomore year of high school.

Retton lived in Houston, Texas, until 2009, when her family returned to West Virginia. She moved back to Houston in 2012. She was married to former University of Texas quarterback and Houston real estate developer Shannon Kelley, who now works for the Houston Baptist University athletic department. Together they have four daughters: Shayla (born 1995), McKenna (born 1997), a former NCAA gymnast at Louisiana State University, Skyla (born 2000), and Emma (born 2002).

Retton divorced her husband in February 2018.

Gymnastics career
Retton was inspired by watching Nadia Comăneci outshine defending Olympic two-event winner Olga Korbut on television at the 1976 Summer Olympics in Montreal, when she herself was eight years of age, and she took up gymnastics in her hometown of Fairmont, West Virginia. She was coached by Gary Rafaloski. She then decided to move to Houston, Texas, to train under Romanians Béla and Márta Károlyi, who had coached Nadia Comăneci before their defection to the United States. Under the Károlyis, Retton soon began to make a name for herself in the U.S., winning the American Cup in 1983 and placing second to Dianne Durham (another Károlyi student) at the US Nationals that same year. Though Retton missed the World Gymnastics Championships in 1983 due to a wrist injury, she won the American Classic in 1983 and 1984, as well as Japan's Chunichi Cup in 1983.

After winning her second American Cup, the U.S. Nationals, and the U.S. Olympic Trials in 1984, Retton suffered a knee injury when she was performing a floor routine at a local gymnastics center at this time. She had sat down to sign autographs when she felt her knee lock, forcing her to undergo an operation five weeks prior to the 1984 Summer Olympics, which were going to be held in Los Angeles—the first time the Summer Olympics had been held in the United States in 52 years. She recovered just in time for this most prestigious of tournaments, and in the competition, which was boycotted by the Soviet bloc nations except for Romania, Retton was engaged in a close battle with Ecaterina Szabo of Romania for the all-around gold medal. Trailing Szabo (after uneven bars and balance beam) by 0.15 with two events to go, Retton scored perfect 10s on floor exercise and vault—the last event in an especially dramatic fashion, as there had been fears that her knee injury and the subsequent surgery might impair her performance. Retton won the all-around gold medal by 0.05 points, beating Szabo to become first female gymnast from outside Eastern Europe to win the individual all-around gold. She also became the first American woman to be an Olympic all-around champion – an honor she held alone until the ongoing five-peat of American all-around champions (in order: Carly Patterson in 2004 in Athens, Nastia Liukin in 2008 in Beijing, Gabby Douglas in 2012 in London, Simone Biles in 2016 in Rio de Janeiro and Suni Lee in 2021 in Tokyo).

At the same Olympics, Retton won four additional medals: silver in the team competition and the horse vault, and bronze in the floor exercise and uneven bars. For her performance, she was named Sports Illustrated Magazine's "Sportswoman of the Year." She appeared on a Wheaties box, and became the cereal's first official spokeswoman.

In 1985, Retton won the American Cup all-around competition for the third and final time. She retired in 1986.

Post-gymnastics career

Political views

Retton was an outspoken supporter of the Reagan administration and appeared in a variety of television ads supporting Ronald Reagan as well as appearing at a rally for his reelection campaign just a month after the Olympics in her home state of West Virginia. Retton delivered the Pledge of Allegiance with fellow former gymnast and 1996 Olympic gold medalist Kerri Strug on the second night of the 2004 Republican National Convention.

Non-sports honors
Retton's hometown, Fairmont, West Virginia, named a road and a park in the town after her. Having retired from gymnastics after winning an unprecedented third American Cup title in 1985, as noted above, she later had cameo appearances as herself in Scrooged and Naked Gun : The Final Insult.

In 1985, she received the Golden Plate Award of the American Academy of Achievement presented by Awards Council member General Chuck Yeager.

Retton was elected to the National Italian American Sports Hall of Fame in 1992.

In 1993, the Associated Press released results of a sports study in which Retton was statistically tied for first place with fellow Olympian Dorothy Hamill as the most popular athlete in America.

In 1997, Retton was inducted into the International Gymnastics Hall of Fame.

In January 2020, Retton was the first woman inducted into the Houston Sports Hall of Fame.

Compensated endorsements
During the 1990s, Retton worked as a spokeswoman, appearing in advertisements for the U.S. drugstore chain Revco.

Retton has many commercial endorsements, including bowling and shampoo.  She was the first female athlete to be pictured on the front of a Wheaties box, and General Mills stated that Wheaties sales improved after her appearance. In 2019, Retton became a spokesperson for Australian Dream, a pain relief cream. She is a frequent analyst for televised gymnastics and attended The University of Texas at Austin after the Olympics.

The USA Gymnastics scandal
Retton was thrust back into the spotlight when the USA Gymnastics sex abuse scandal hit the news in 2016. When the Protecting Young Victims from Sexual Abuse and Safe Sport Authorization Act of 2017 was introduced to the 115th Congress, she and other members of USA Gymnastics met with the bill sponsor, Senator Dianne Feinstein, with the aim of convincing her to drop the bill. Despite these efforts, on February 14, 2018, the Protecting Young Victims from Sexual Abuse and Safe Sport Authorization Act of 2017 was signed into law and became effective immediately.

Film and TV appearances
1985: ABC Funfit; hosted a series of five-minute segments on physical fitness which were broadcast between Saturday morning cartoons.
1988: Scrooged; as herself.
1992: Knots Landing; as herself in the episode "Letting Go".
1993: Baywatch; in the episode "The Child Inside".
1994: An Evening at the Improv; as herself.
1994: Naked Gun 33 1/3: The Final Insult; as herself.
2002: Mary Lou's Flip Flop Shop.
2010: Glee; in the episode "Grilled Cheesus" Sue Sylvester refers to Mary Lou Retton as her worst enemy.
2014: RadioShack Super Bowl XLVIII commercial "The '80s Called";  cameo appearance.
2018: Appeared as a contestant on 27th season of Dancing with the Stars, partnered with Sasha Farber. Eliminated Week 6 - 9th Place

Medical conditions
Retton was born with hip dysplasia, a condition that her years as a competitive gymnast aggravated. After experiencing increased pain from the condition, she underwent hip replacement surgery on her left hip in her mid-thirties.

Gymnastics legacy
Retton's routine on the uneven bars included a move that came to be called "The Retton Flip." This consisted of a transition (front flip) from low- to high-bar, resulting in the gymnast perched or "sitting" on top of the high bar. This move, and many others like it, were removed from the Code of Points of artistic gymnastics due to old-style "belly beat" moves having ceased to be used in bars competitions.

See also

List of Olympic female gymnasts for the United States
List of Olympic medal leaders in women's gymnastics

References

External links

Official website
Where Are They Now?: Mary Lou Retton Photos & Info

List of competitive results at Gymn Forum
Mary Lou Retton 2007 Interview with Béla Károlyi on Sidewalks Entertainment
The "Retton Flip"

1968 births
Living people
American female artistic gymnasts
Gymnasts at the 1984 Summer Olympics
Olympic gold medalists for the United States in gymnastics
Olympic silver medalists for the United States in gymnastics
Olympic bronze medalists for the United States in gymnastics
Originators of elements in artistic gymnastics
Gymnasts from Texas
Kelley family
Sportspeople from Fairmont, West Virginia
West Virginia Republicans
Texas Republicans
Medalists at the 1984 Summer Olympics
U.S. women's national team gymnasts
Fairmont Senior High School alumni
Conservatism in the United States
American people of Italian descent